Thomas Horan may refer to:

Thomas Horan (Medal of Honor) (1839-1902), Medal of Honor recipient 
Thomas Horan (cricketer, born 1886), Australian cricketer
Tom Horan (1854-1916), Australian cricketer